Nannosalarias nativitatis, the pygmy blenny or throatspot blenny, is a species of combtooth blenny found in coral reefs in the western Pacific and Indian oceans.  This species grows to a length of  TL.  It is also commonly known as the Christmas blenny or the Christmas Island blenny.  This species is the only known member of its genus.

References

Salarinae
Taxa named by Charles Tate Regan
Fish described in 1909